The 2016 season was Remo's 102nd existence. The club participated in the Campeonato Brasileiro Série C, the Campeonato Paraense, the Copa Verde and the Copa do Brasil.

Remo finished outside of the top four of the Campeonato Brasileiro Série C (5th place in the group stage and 11th overall). The club finished in the 4th place of the Campeonato Paraense. In the Copa Verde, Remo was eliminated in the semi-finals by Paysandu 6-3 in the aggregate. In the Copa do Brasil, the club was eliminated in the first round by Vasco da Gama 3-1 in the aggregate.

Players

Squad information
Numbers in parentheses denote appearances as substitute.

Top scorers

Disciplinary record

Kit
Supplier: Umbro / Main sponsor: Banpará

Transfers

Transfers in

Transfers out

Notes

Competitions

Campeonato Brasileiro Série C

Group stage

Matches

Campeonato Paraense

First round

Matches

Final stage

Second round

Matches

Copa Verde

Round of 16

Quarter-finals

Semi-finals

Copa do Brasil

First round

References

External links
Official Site 
Remo 100% 

2016 season
Clube do Remo seasons
Brazilian football clubs 2016 season